Nicholas John Wright (born 15 October 1975, in Codnor) is an English former professional footballer who played for Derby County, Carlisle United and Watford before his career was cut short by injury. Wright, who played as a forward, is best remembered for scoring an overhead kick in the 1999 Football League First Division play-off Final, helping secure Watford's promotion to the Premier League. The following season in the top flight Wright only made four league appearances, though this included games against Chelsea, Arsenal and Manchester United.

References

External links

1975 births
Living people
English footballers
Association football forwards
Derby County F.C. players
Carlisle United F.C. players
Watford F.C. players
Premier League players
English Football League players